Jamarr Sanders (born August 2, 1988) is an American professional basketball player for Tezenis Verona of the LBA. He played college basketball for Alabama State, Northwest Florida State College and UAB. As a senior at UAB, Sanders was named to the First Team Conference USA. On December 18, 2016, he signed a one-week tryout with the Italian team.

Career
On January 29, 2017, Sanders signed with the German club Telekom Baskets Bonn.

On July 12, 2018, Sanders signed with the Italian club Pallacanestro Trieste.

On July 3, 2019, he has signed 1-year deal with Gaziantep Basketbol of the Turkish Basketbol Süper Ligi.

On January 20, 2020 he signed a deal with the Italian club Derthona Basket. Sanders extended his contract with the team on July 26, 2021.

On September 17, 2022, he has signed with SIG Strasbourg of the French LNB Pro A.

On November 1, 2022, he signed with Tezenis Verona of the LBA.

References

External links
 UAB bio 
 Jamarr Sanders at Sports Reference
 LagaBasket profile

1988 births
Living people
Alabama State Hornets basketball players
American expatriate basketball people in Germany
American expatriate basketball people in Greece
American expatriate basketball people in Italy
American men's basketball players
Aquila Basket Trento players
Austin Toros players
Basketball players from Montgomery, Alabama
Gaziantep Basketbol players
K.A.O.D. B.C. players
Lega Basket Serie A players
Northwest Florida State Raiders men's basketball players
Pallacanestro Trieste players
Shooting guards
SIG Basket players
Telekom Baskets Bonn players
UAB Blazers men's basketball players
Veroli Basket players